Pseudotelphusa is a genus of moths in the family Gelechiidae.

Species

Former species
Pseudotelphusa decuriella
Pseudotelphusa fugitivella

References

 
Litini
Moth genera